Sir Stephen Stewart Templeton Young, 3rd Baronet, QC, is a Scottish baronet and held the post of Sheriff Principal of Grampian, Highland and Islands from 2001 until 2012. He is the third Baronet of Partick.

He gained an MA degree from Oxford University and an LLB degree from the University of Edinburgh.

He was appointed Sheriff Principal of Grampian, Highlands and Islands in 2001, a position he held until 2012.

He became a QC in 2002 and in 2005 was appointed Chairman of the Sheriff Court Rules Council.

He is also ex officio a Commissioner of the Northern Lighthouse Board, and a Governor of The Robert Gordon University.

Arms

References 

Baronets in the Baronetage of the United Kingdom
Scottish sheriffs
Living people
21st-century King's Counsel
Scottish King's Counsel
Alumni of the University of Edinburgh School of Law
Alumni of Trinity College, Oxford
1947 births
Partick